Cody White (born July 1, 1988) is a former American football offensive guard. He played college football at Illinois State.

Professional career

Houston Texans
On April 29, 2012, he signed with the Houston Texans as an undrafted free agent. On August 31, 2012, he was released by the team. On September 3, 2012, he was signed to the practice squad. He was released by the team on September 1, 2015.

References

External links
Illinois State bio 
Houston Texans bio

Living people
1988 births
American football offensive guards
Illinois State Redbirds football players
Houston Texans players
Players of American football from Columbus, Ohio